Clubul Sportiv Municipal Bucovina Rădăuți, commonly known as Bucovina Rădăuți, is a Romanian professional football club based in Rădăuți, Romania, founded in 1956. Currently the team plays in Liga III.

History
Clubul Sportiv Municipal Bucovina Rădăuți was founded in 1956 as Progresul Rădăuți to continue the football tradition in Rădăuți started before World War II by Hatmanul Luca Arbore Rădăuți and then continued by teams like: Jahn Rădăuți and Hagwiruch Rădăuți.

Bucovinenii played almost all their history at Liga III being a traditional team at this level and the best performance of the club was at the end of 1958–1959 season when it finished on the 2nd place.

From the beginning of 60's the club played under the name of Metalul Rădăuți, the name with which it would evolve throughout the communist period, from 1991 the team was renamed as Bucovina Rădăuți.

At the end of the 2003–04 Divizia C season Bucovina Rădăuți relegated to Liga IV being then unable for several consecutive years to return to Liga III.
In the 2011–12 season Bucovina Frătăuții Noi won Liga IV – Suceava County and promoted to Liga III after the play-off match, then in the summer of the same year the team was moved from Frătăuții Noi to Rădăuți and renamed as Bucovina Rădăuți reinventing the football tradition of Rădăuți.

In the middle of the 2015–16 Liga III season Rădăuțenii withdrew from Liga III due to financial problems. In the summer of 2016 the team enrolled in Liga IV-Suceava County and after one year the club was promoted back to Liga III after a play-off match against Bistrița-Năsăud County champions, ACS Dumitra.

Honours

Leagues

Liga III:
Winners (1): 2020–21
Runners-up (2): 1958–59, 2018–19
Liga IV – Suceava County
Winners (5): 1969–70, 1972–73, 1996–97, 2000–01, 2016–17
Runners-up (1): 2008–09

Cups
Romanian Cup – Suceava County
Winners (1): 2016–17

Players

First team squad

Out on loan

Club officials

Board of directors

Current technical staff

League history

References

External links
 

Football clubs in Suceava County
Association football clubs established in 1956
Liga III clubs
Liga IV clubs
1956 establishments in Romania
Rădăuți